In phonology and historical linguistics, feeding order is a situation in which rule A creates new contexts in which rule B can apply; it would not have been possible for rule B to apply otherwise.

If there are two rules, rule A which looks like x → y and rule B which looks like y → z, then the following is a feeding order:
 A: x→y
 B: y→z

The opposite of feeding order, the situation in which rule A destroys a certain context so rule B can no longer apply, is called bleeding order.

Examples

A good example of feeding order can be seen in English, where preglottalization can be considered as rule B. As a consequence of this rule, all voiceless plosives which make part of a word-final consonant cluster are glottalized. This can be seen in the form looked, with the underlying representation . It is pronounced .

Counterfeeding order
If the order of rules which are in feeding order is reversed, this is said to be a counterfeeding order.

If we have two rules, rule A which looks like x → y and rule B which looks like y → z the following is a counterfeeding order:
 B: y→z
 A: x→y

An example of this can be seen in French, where petite nièce ("little niece") is pronounced . If the rule which deletes word-final  in French had been applied before another rule which deletes word-final consonants before another consonant, this would have been an example of feeding order and the "final output" form (surface form) would have been  instead.

A counter-feeding order very often creates phonological opacity. In the given case, it is the application of the rule deleting word-final consonants which has thus become opaque in French.

In historical linguistics, a sequence of rules in counterfeeding order is called a chain shift.  A chain shift can be presented graphically like the following:
 a→b→c→d
where only one rule can apply.  The result is that what was originally a becomes b, what was originally b becomes c, what was originally c becomes d, etc.  In essence, each sound "shifts" one position to the right.  A good example of such a chain shift occurred as part of the Great Vowel Shift, which took place historically in English starting around 1500 AD.  The long front vowels were raised one position, and the original high front vowel became a diphthong:

See also 
Bleeding order
Markedness
Optimality theory

References 

Gussenhoven, C. & Jacobs, H. (1998). Understanding Phonology. Arnold, Londen.
Jensen, J.T. (2004). Principles of Generative Phonology: An introduction.

Phonology
Sound changes